Anne Gibbons is an American cartoonist and greeting card illustrator.

Her cartoons have been published in Redbook, Ladies' Home Journal, Glamour, and Cosmopolitan.

She received the National Cartoonists Society Greeting Card Award for 1999.

From July 2007 until August 2017, she was the Thursday Six Chix cartoonist for King Features Syndicate.

She is married to Ivan Braun and lives in New York City with no kids, no pets, and no plants.

References

External links
 Anne Gibbons' personal website

American comic strip cartoonists
American illustrators
Living people
Year of birth missing (living people)